Peace Emmanuel Aderogba Oredope (born 28 March 2002), professionally known as P.Priime (Big P), is a Nigerian record producer, DJ, music director, mixing engineer and songwriter. 

He is popularly known for the tag "P", "Giddem", at the beginning or end of all his productions. 

P.Priime is well known as a producer on "Anoti" a song on Wizkid's Grammy-nominated album Made in Lagos and three of the tracks from Black Panther: Wakanda Forever - "Anya Mmiri" by CKay ft. PinkPantheress, "Alone" by Burna Boy and "Coming Back For You" by Fireboy DML.

Career 
P.Priime has produced some hit singles like "Ozumba Mbadiwe” by Reekado Banks, “Bandana" by Fireboy DML ft. Asake, "Electricity" by Davido and Pheelz, “Loading” by Olamide ft. Bad Boy Timz and many more. 

He co-produced Wizkid’s Made In Lagos: Deluxe Edition Album, Aṣa's V Album and 7 out of 10 songs on Olamide’s album – Carpe Diem.

P.Priime was a member of the 2018 Sarz Academy. In 2021, he was nominated for producer of the year at the AFRIMMA Awards and won. YouTube also announced P.Priime as one of the two Nigerian Producers for YouTube Black Voices Songwriter/Producer Class of 2022.

Beyond music, P.Priime loves modelling and has walked the runway for Elfreda Kahlo at the Lagos Fashion Week 2021.

Biography 
Born in Lagos state, into a family of choristers, P.Priime began playing drums at age 4 and mastering the piano at the age of 8. He also plays the saxophone and guitar.

He attended Nuga Paul High School, Ejigbo, Lagos. After graduation, he attended a summer school at the Musical Society of Nigeria Centre.

Instruments 
Drums. Piano. Saxophone. Guitar. Synthesizer

Awards and nominations 
P.Priime's contributions to the Nigerian music industry has earned him recognition in various award shows and events including the Best Global Music Album category in the 64th Annual Grammy Awards for Wizkid's Made in Lagos: Deluxe Edition.

Production discography

References

External links 
 P.Priime on Instagram
 P.Priime on Twitter 
 P.Priime on TikTok
 P.Priime on YouTube
 P.Priime on Facebook
 Spotify Playlist 
 Apple Music c Playlist
 Boomplay Playlist

2002 births
Living people
Nigerian songwriters
Nigerian hip hop record producers
Record producers